Hund may refer to:
Hund (surname)
Hund (village), a village in Swabi district, Pakistan
Hund School, Kansas, USA
Hund (card game), German card game
 Hund or Voller Hund, German card game
 Hund Şehzade (1422–1455), Ottoman princess

See also
Hundt, a surname

Surnames from nicknames